Edmund Harvey (3 November 1852 – 23 February 1902) was an English first-class cricketer active 1872 who played for Middlesex and Cambridge University. He was born in Islington; died in Falmouth, Cornwall.

References

1852 births
1902 deaths
English cricketers
Middlesex cricketers
Cambridge University cricketers
Non-international England cricketers
Gentlemen of England cricketers